Florida's 110th House District elects one member of the Florida House of Representatives. The district is represented by José R. Oliva. This district is located in the Miami metropolitan area. The district covers a portion of Miami-Dade County including a portion of Hialeah, Florida. 

As of the 2010 Census, the district's population is 154,817.

Past Representatives

References 

110
Miami-Dade County, Florida